Sobral is a Portuguese surname. Notable people with the surname include:

 Carlos Sobral (born 1950), Brazilian jewelry designer
 Figueiredo Sobral (1926 – 13 August 2010), Portuguese painter, sculptor and poet.
 José María Sobral (1880–1961), Argentine military scientist and Antarctic explorer
 Leila Sobral (born 1974), Brazilian basketball player
 Luísa Sobral (born 1987), Portuguese singer and songwriter
 Marcos Sobral (born 1960), Brazilian botanist
 Marta Sobral (born 1964), Brazilian female basketball player
 Manuel Sobral (born 1968), Canadian welterweight boxer
 Renato Sobral (born 1975), professional mixed martial arts fighter
 Salvador Sobral (born 1989), Portuguese singer

Portuguese-language surnames